Vedam is a 2010 Indian Telugu-language anthology film written and directed by Krish, and produced by Shobu Yarlagadda and Prasad Devineni under their banner Arka Media Works. The film features an ensemble cast consisting of Allu Arjun, Anushka Shetty, Manchu Manoj, Manoj Bajpayee, Saranya Ponvannan, Nagayya, Deeksha Seth, and Lekha Washington. M. M. Keeravani composed the music while Gnana Shekar V. S. did the cinematography.

Broadly falling into the hyperlink cinema genre, the film was critically acclaimed,gained cult status receiving several accolades. including four Filmfare Awards (Best Film, Best Director, Best Actor and Best Actress). Film Companion included Vedam in their list of 25 Greatest Telugu Films Of The Decade. Krish later remade the film in Tamil as Vaanam (2011).

Plot
  
Vedam revolves around five principal characters.

Vivek Chakravarthy is an upcoming rock star in Bengaluru who hails from a family of decorated army officers. His mother wants him to follow the same path, but he is not interested. He is about to give his first live concert on New Year's Eve with his bandmates in Hyderabad. However, Vivek is late to catch the flight, forcing the band to travel by road. After some time, one of their tyres gets deflated. Not having a spare, the other friends go to get the tyre inflated, leaving Vivek and  Lasya alone. Meanwhile, they are attacked by a fanatic group. However, they manage to get out of the mess with the help of a truck driver who incidentally gets involved in an earlier altercation with Vivek. The band successfully reaches Hyderabad. However, they suffer a minor accident there, which involves a mother in labour, So Vivek and Lasya take her to a hospital nearby.

Saroja is a prostitute in Amalapuram working for Rattamma. She has a best friend Karpooram, who is a eunuch. Saroja doesn't like working for Rattamma and plans to run away from there. Her dreams come true when she receives a call from Hyderabad from one of her agents. The very next day, which happens to be New Year's Eve, she leaves for Hyderabad with Karpooram without Rattamma's knowledge, but not before putting the local sub-inspector Bullebbayi to sleep using pills before sleeping with him. However, Saroja is arrested in Hyderabad by constables for betraying Bullebbayi. Karpooram frees her from the inspector, and both are taken by their agent to a client. The client turns out to be yet another broker who bought Saroja and Karpooram from Rattamma. Both successfully escape from the broker after a scuffle, during which Karpooram gets stabbed. So, Saroja takes her to the same hospital that Vivek and Lasya take the pregnant lady to.

Ramulu is a debt-ridden weaver from Sircilla. He lives with his widowed daughter-in-law Padma and grandson. Ramulu is desperate to get his grandson educated, being illiterate himself. However, he owes money to the local landlord, who takes his grandson away, saying he would be sent to the construction business in the city for 11 years to recover the money. He gives Ramulu and Padma three days to clear the debt. Not knowing what to do, Padma agrees to sell her kidney, which is illegal, as Ramulu had previously sold his kidney for the same purpose. They come to Hyderabad, and her kidney is sold successfully in the hospital where the previous four characters are. The original kidney is sold for 1,00,000, of which Ramulu gets 37,000.

Rahimuddin Qureshi is hailing from Old Basti in Hyderabad. In the past, his wife suffered a miscarriage due to a scuffle between him and a few devotees during a religious procession. Unable to bear the loss, he decides to leave the country. However, during his farewell party, Shivaram, who previously insulted Rahim during the scuffle, comes to his house and arrests his nephews, alleging that they have links with terrorists. When Rahim obstructs him, he arrests him too. During interrogation, one of his nephews accepts his terrorist background and says something tragic would happen on New Year's Eve. Rahim is shocked. When the police transport him to remand, Rahim panics and tries to escape. However, his escape bid is unsuccessful, and he gets shot in the leg. He is then taken to the same hospital as the rest of the characters are in and kept in the same ward as another terrorist suspect.

Anand Raj also known as Cable Raju is a lower middle class guy hailing from Jubilee Hills slum, living with his maternal grandmother. He loves Pooja, who is from the upper class of the society. Pooja, however, doesn't know of Raju's financial background and thinks of him to be rich. Raju has to get two passes for a lavish New Year's Eve party which cost almost 40,000. He tries to obtain that money by various means but is unsuccessful. He even tries to snatch chains from women's necks but is apprehended by the police when his motorbike hits a police van. He is taken to the police station where he meets Saroja. However, Dappu Subani, who initiated him into the chain-snatching business, comes to his rescue and gets him freed. His grandmother, vexed at his behaviour, gives him 3,000 rupees and asks him to do whatever he wants. In a local cafeteria, he happens to see Ramulu with his money bundle, decides to steal it, and follows him to the hospital. He successfully manages to steal the bundle from Ramulu and Padma. However, as he is about to pay for the passes, he realizes his mistake, adds his own 3,000 rupees to the bundle and returns it to Ramulu at the hospital.

Meanwhile, a group of terrorists come to the ward housing Rahim and free their leader. They leave Rahim unharmed on account of him being a Muslim and start the terrorist attack. Raju and Vivek try to save as many people as possible. They even kill two terrorists in the process. Rahim saves Shivaram's life. In the final fight sequence, Raju and Vivek valiantly give up their lives, trying to protect the people in the hospital.

The conclusion of the movie shows Saroja deciding to change her profession; Vivek was dead but is recognized as a national hero; Raju was dead being respected by all in his community, with Pooja coming to see him along with her mother; and Rahim being freed by Shivaram. As for Ramulu, the landlord tries to fool him by saying he did not pay enough, but Ramulu's grandson calculates and said he paid enough. The landlord is impressed and lets them go.

Cast

Production

Development 
Director Krish had a visual of an old man walking along with a child in his dreams. However, he felt it as too arty to make a film and also the story was not complete. One day while travelling from Guntur to Hyderabad, he narrated the story of Nagayya (initially he named it Jalayya) to cinematographer Gnana Sekhar, who also worked with him in Gamyam. The second story initially he conceptualised was about a film crew and later changed it to music band. The title of Vedam struck him when he was writing the story at Sirivennela's home. The climax of the film was an inspiration from 26/11 Mumbai blasts in Taj Hotel. After getting a basic storyline he decided to produce Vedam on his banner First Frame Entertainment, before producers Shobu Yarlagadda and Prasad Devineni decided to finance it.

Casting 
Krish wanted to do the character of Karpooram, but decided against it after his mother warned him. Later, when discussing the story with Anushka Shetty, she suggested her personal make-up person Nikki for the role and Krish liked him. Anushka reduced her remuneration by 30% as the film was a low budget production. Rahimuddin Qureshi (the character played by Manoj Bajpai) is the name of Krish's best friend in intermediate. Newcomer Nagayya was cast in the film. The five principal characters were based on the five natural elements-Water, Air, Earth, Fire and Sky. It notably became the first film Allu Arjun and Manoj Manchu starred in that did not involve their respective fathers Allu Aravind and Mohan Babu.

Music

The film's music was composed by M. M. Keeravani while the lyrics were written by Sirivennela Seetarama Sastry, Sahiti, E. S. Murthy and M. M. Keeravani The audio was released in the presence of notable Telugu film personalities on 3 May 2010.

The song "Egiripothe Entha Baguntundi", performed by Sunitha & M. M. Keeravani, became a major hit in Hyderabad and the state of Andhra Pradesh in the months following the release of the audio and film. Tracks 9 to 12 of the soundtrack were only made available on the official Digital release and not the physical CD.

Promotion
Vedam had no promotional activities since the film's launch in 2010. The first activity happened just before the music launch, by releasing the wallpaper masking the main actors and highlighting the film's title at www.idlebrain.com. After the film's music launch, the wallpaper was re-released by revealing the actors. The film was given A certificate because of violence and Anushka's character by CBFC for video release.

Critical reception
The Times of India gave a review stating "After watching contrived plots and stereotype protagonists, this path-breaking movie arrives like a breath of fresh air. Undeniably, it's another inspiring film from the maker of Gamyam." Rediff gave a review stating "Vedam is a must-watch for its story, screenplay, direction and technicalities. It offers hope to the audience interested in good and sensible cinema that such a film can be made in Telugu. Vedam is a beautiful confluence of writing and technical aspects. It has set a benchmark in Telugu cinema." idlebrain.com gave a review stating "Vedam is a good film. Please watch it and encourage good/meaningful cinema. This film will be liked by classes and A center audiences. If masses and B/C centers patronage Vedam, it will not only do good to the film but to the entire Telugu film industry." Esskay of 123telugu.com gave a review stating "If films like Vedam aren't encouraged, we will be left with films that will be made with only money and without a soul! Watch Vedam and ask your friends to watch it, for the sake of good cinema in Telugu. The noise of clapping by the audience after the film finished is the loudest I've heard. I plead and rest my case!"

Awards
 Nandi Awards of 2010
 Best Feature Film - Gold - Shobu Yarlagadda
 Special Jury Award - Nagayya

 58th Filmfare Awards South
 Best Film – Shobu Yarlagadda & Prasad Devineni
 Best Director – Krish
 Best Actor – Allu Arjun
 Best Actress – Anushka Shetty

 Nominations
 Best Music Director - M. M. Keeravani
 Best Female Playback Singer - Sunitha - "Egiripothe Entha Baguntundi"
 Best Lyricist - Sirivennela Sitaramasastri - "Now or Never"

 2011 CineMAA Awards
 Best Actress (Jury) – Anushka Shetty
 Best Director (Jury) – Krish
 Special Jury – Nagayya

References

External links
 

2010 films
Films set in Telangana
Indian anthology films
Films directed by Krish
Films scored by M. M. Keeravani
2010s Telugu-language films
Telugu films remade in other languages
Hyperlink films
Indian nonlinear narrative films
Films about prostitution in India
2010 action drama films
Indian action drama films